The Talisman is a comic book adaptation published by Del Rey of the novel of the same name written by Stephen King and Peter Straub.

The first issue, a limited edition #0, was released at Comic-Con in July 2009. This prequel issue was published in non-limited release on October 21, 2009.  The script is by Robin Furth, pencils/inks by Tony Shasteen, colors by Nei Ruffino and JD Mettler, and lettering by Bill Tortolini.  The cover art work is by Massimo Carnevale. A hardcover collection has been published on May 4, 2010.

The second story arc, The Talisman: A Collision of Worlds was announced for release in June 2010 but was put on hold by the publishers and has yet to be released.

This is different from the original title of the book “The Talisman” written by novelist Sir Walter Scott.

Story arcs

References

2009 comics debuts
2010 comics endings
Comics based on works by Stephen King